Park Street (or IIHM Park Street for sponsorship reason) is a station of the Kolkata Metro. The station is located on the crossing of Jawaharlal Nehru Road and Mother Teresa Sarani (previously called Park Street after which the station was named). It is one of the deepest underground metro stations of Kolkata Metro. It is the only underground station to have side platforms, which are mostly seen in elevated metro stations.

History

Construction

The station

Structure
Park Street is underground metro station, situated on the Kolkata Metro Line 1 and the Kolkata Metro Line 3 of Kolkata Metro.

Layout

Connections

Gallery

See also

Kolkata
List of Kolkata Metro stations
Transport in Kolkata
Kolkata Metro Rail Corporation
Kolkata Suburban Railway
Kolkata Monorail
Trams in Kolkata
Bhowanipore
Chowringhee Road
List of rapid transit systems
List of metro systems

References

External links

 
 
 Official Website for line 1
 UrbanRail.Net – descriptions of all metro systems in the world, each with a schematic map showing all stations.

Kolkata Metro stations
Railway stations in Kolkata
Railway stations opened in 1984
1984 establishments in India